Michael Alexandro Sosa Molina (born 20 February 2002) is a Honduran footballer who plays as a forward for North Texas SC in USL League One, and the FC Dallas academy.

References

External links
 
 Michael Sosa at FC Dallas

2002 births
Living people
Honduran footballers
Honduran emigrants to the United States
Association football forwards
North Texas SC players
Soccer players from Texas
USL League One players